Caio Duilio is a destroyer of the Italian Navy. Caio Duilio is marked by hull number D 554 according to NATO classification.

History

Background
The ship takes her name from the 3rd century BC Roman leader and admiral Gaius Duilius (Caio Duilio in Italian). Duilius ordered the construction of 120 ships that were armed with hooked bridges called corvus, Latin for “crow”.  This innovation allowed the Romans to defeat the powerful enemy fleet of Carthage transforming the naval battle into a melee combat.

After the victory over the Carthaginians at the Battle of Mylae in 260 BC, Duilius was honored with a triumphal parade and the erection in the Roman Forum of a column adorned with the beaks of captured Carthaginian warships; the column both became his symbol and appears today in the coat of arms of the ship.

The destroyer Caio Duilio is the fourth Italian warship with this historical name. The first, the ironclad , was commissioned in 1886 and served until 1909. Fitted with the largest guns available, 100-ton 450 mm calibre muzzle-loading guns, she was regarded as the most powerful warship afloat in her day. Caio Duilio was launched on October 23, 2007 and transported to Muggiano shipyard on October 29 for the mounting of the combat system.

Caio Duilios motto refers to the ancient Roman tradition, in which the name acquires religious connotations. Some ancient fragments point up this intimate meaning. "Nomen Numen" can be translated as "the name means power".

Description
 
Caio Duilio is a multirole ship, with a bias towards anti-aircraft warfare (the ship is much more capable in this role than the older destroyers) and short and medium-range defence capabilities. She is also highly capable in anti-submarine and anti-surface warfare.

The ship has been designed to take and operate with Rotary wing aircraft (AW101 and NH-90) of much higher performance and more autonomy than previous generation helicopters. The handling of wheeled helicopters on the flight deck is guaranteed up to sea state 6 by the semi-automatic Canadian system TC-ASIST of Indal Technologies committing to these operations a single operator.

By type of ship and technology aboard Caio Duilio is able to cover a broad spectrum of maritime activities, ranging from high-intensity military operations to Maritime Security operations. The missions that the unit can perform are: 
 Escort role in an aircraft carrier battle group or naval convoy;
 Command and control of joint and combined maritime operations in all forms of aeronaval warfare;
 Naval Command in support or integrated in the National Air Defense organization;
 Relief operations in case of natural disasters, crisis response and humanitarian operations;
 Counter-piracy operations.

The ship was designed to be as little detectable by radar as possible, by using stealth technology for the hull and superstructure. Sea-keeping in unfavorable weather conditions is granted by two pairs of stabilizers.

The acoustic signature was also reduced with an appropriate choice of machinery and engineering solutions and verifying the intensity of the radiated noise, since the design phase. Equal attention has been directed in the infrared (IR) signature branch, by lowering the temperature of engine gases through coaxial exhausts.

Combat system 
This is provided with  10 redundant servers and 24 consoles named MFC (Multi Function Console), of which 19 are located in the Primary CIC (Combat Information Centre), 3 in the secondary CIC in a remote area from the primary CIC, 1 in the Admiral CIC (for staff at the level of CTF/CTG, equipped with special command support systems) and 1 in the bridge for the officer of the watch.
 

With a MFC each operator, once logged in with own user name and password, can access to all relevant tactical data to his role and has also the possibility to use some common features such as watching the video of cameras or of the IR system, the weapons engagement plan, the situation of the hardware and software subsystems, the flight orders or the weather situation.  Web-browsing allows a range of information going from messaging,  data exchange with the Command Support System, the weather state and information pages of various kinds.

Once put the ships to escort and the relative priority in the CMS, the system automatically performs the control and the evaluation of dangerous of each air target, and suggests the possible engagement with missiles, artillery or jammers. The system can control up to 24 Aster missiles simultaneously in flight, providing to operators the kill assessment.

There is also a training module that, under the supervision of an "Exercise Director", simulates of complex tactical situations by faithfully reproducing the capabilities of weapons and sensors on board. This allows conducting exercises which were previously possible only with the ship actually at sea.

For the first time in the history of the Italian Navy a ship is provided with an autonomous meteorological and oceanographic system (Metoc), capable of launching atmospheric balloons to make sonar, optical sensors and radar range prediction.

All subsystems, in integrated mode, operate directly managed by the CMS, but in case of battle damage can be managed locally, thus providing a combat Unity survival.

The DCNS Multi-link system, to be replaced in next future with Elsag Datamat M-DLP (Multi Data Link Processor), allows the simultaneous handling of multiple network links (with gateway and forwarding functions) of Link 11, Link 16 type, on radio or on satellite vector. These vectors, also for the voice comms, are fully integrated and managed by the CMS through the subsystem FICS (Fully Integrated Communications System) by Thales Communications.

Platform 

The Platform Management System (PMS), designed by DCNS, allows to command and monitor machinery, electrical equipment, auxiliary services and security services. The entire system can be managed by a simple laptop but it has its own dedicated consoles in the Operative Platform Office, in the two Security Control Posts  (fore and aft), on the bridge and in every technical areas.
 
The unit's hull is divided into two vulnerability areas by a double bulkhead and a cofferdam to improve anti-fire and anti-flooding characteristics. 
Each vulnerability area is in turn formed by two security zones divided into watertight compartments that provide buoyancy with three adjacent compartments flooded. Many systems, both of the platform than of the combat system, are duplicated so that each vulnerability area is independent by the other.

Most of the rooms are equipped with automatic fire and smoke detection systems. Moreover every room is equipped with sprinklers for water, for the additive F-500 (higher performance compared to the foam) or CO2 extinguisher systems. These, unlike the previous generation units, are activated remotely from Security Post by the PMS.

For what concerns CBRN (Chemical, biological, radiological, and nuclear) warfare, there are a specially dedicated decontamination station, a series of new generation sensors for such hazards detection disseminated throughout the ship and an external prewashing facility.

The propulsion system consists of two controllable pitch propellers, which can be coupled independently of each other, via gear couplings, with a diesel engine or a gas turbine in a typical CODOG configuration. The manoeuvrability is provided by a pair of rudders and an electric powered bow thruster.

The daily production of drinking water is 50 m³ because of two installed reverse osmosis desalinators.

Career
On February 12, 2008 Caio Duilio performed her first sea trial and was accepted into the Italian Navy on April 3, 2009. Caio Duilio was, along with the aircraft carrier  and the training ship , one of the ships visitable in Civitavecchia harbour on the Day of the Unification of Italy and the Armed Forces on November 4, 2009.

She participated in the naval parades for the celebrations of the Italian Navy Day in Naples on June 10, 2010 and in La Spezia on June 10, 2011, in the presence of President Giorgio Napolitano.

During the development of many complex systems on board, and during the trials that led her many times in the Naval Station of Taranto, she made her debut in the international arena during NATO exercise Proud Manta 2011 from February 4 to February 17, 2011, in the waters of the Ionian Sea, even before the delivery of the Battle Ensign (that took place in Gaeta on September 22, 2011), working together with ships, submarines and aircraft of nine allied nations.

Caio Duilio is the only destroyer based in La Spezia harbour, flagship of the Commander of First Naval Group (COMGRUPNAV 1).

References

External links 

 Destroyer Caio Duilio Marina Militare

Orizzonte-class destroyers
Ships built in Italy
2007 ships
Ships built by Fincantieri

pl:Caio Duilio